USS Benham has been the name of three ships in the United States Navy, all of them named in honor of Andrew Ellicot Kennedy Benham.

 , was a  during World War II.

Sources

United States Navy ship names